Antanartia delius, the forest admiral or orange admiral, is a butterfly in the family Nymphalidae. It is found in Senegal, Sierra Leone, Liberia, Ivory Coast, Ghana, Nigeria, Cameroon, Equatorial Guinea, the Republic of the Congo, Angola, the Democratic Republic of the Congo, Uganda, Kenya, and Tanzania. The habitat consists of lowland forests.

Both sexes are attracted to fermented fruit.

The larvae feed on Australina acuminata, Pouzolzia parasitica, Musanga and Urtica species. They live in tents constructed from the leaves of their host plant. This tent is made by chewing through the midrib near the end of the leaf and forming this into a cylindrical shelter.

Description
Upperside. Antennae black. Thorax and abdomen red brown. Anterior wings nearly black at the base, and also half of them next the tips, whereon are five small white spots, the middle of them being of a dark orange. Posterior wings also black at the base; each of them is furnished with two tails, the outward ones the longest; the external edges being bordered with dark brown, almost black, and all the middle part of the wing is dark orange.

Underside. Palpi and legs yellowish. Breast dark brown. Abdomen yellowish. Wings with blackish and dark brown spots and marks, not to be distinctly described. Anterior wings with a broad yellowish bar crossing them from the anterior edges to the lower corners; while the posterior are also remarkable for a blueish patch placed between the outer tails and the abdominal corners. Wingspan nearly  inches (60 mm).

Subspecies
Antanartia delius delius (Senegal, Sierra Leone, Liberia, Ivory Coast, Ghana, Nigeria, Cameroon, Congo, Angola, Democratic Republic of the Congo, Uganda, western Kenya, western Tanzania)
Antanartia delius guineensis Howarth, 1966 (Bioko)

References

Butterflies described in 1782
Nymphalini
Taxa named by Dru Drury